Kichi-Karakol is a village in Osh Region of Kyrgyzstan. It is part of the Alay District. Its population was 2,039 in 2021.

Nearby villages include Chong-Karakol, Jerge-Tal and Chiy-Talaa.

References

External links 
Satellite map at Maplandia.com

Populated places in Osh Region